The Farmall 60 series tractors are general-purpose row-crop tractors that replaced the larger models of the Farmall letter series beginning in 1958. Produced from 1958 to 1963, the Farmall 460 and 560 tractors represented a modernization of the Farmall H and Farmall M respectively, with higher-horsepower 6-cylinder engines in a restyled body. The heavy general-purpose 660 was sold under the International brand, and was a successor to the McCormick-Deering W series tractors.

Description
The new styling abandoned the Raymond Loewy styling of the letter series in favor of a squared-off look that was retained until the end of the Farmall product run.The new tractors could be adapted to operate on gasoline, kerosene, LP gas, and distillate fuels, and a diesel engine option was offered for each. The larger engines were combined with the essentially unaltered powertrain of the earlier models, producing immediate problems with reliability, particularly with the 560, resulting in a public relations problem for International Harvester, and requiring replacement with new, redesigned powertrain components as part of a massive recall effort. All models had improved hydraulic systems and were more comfortable to operate than their predecessors.

Farmall 460
The Farmall 460 is a row crop tractor produced from 1958 to 1963. A  diesel version was also offered. Variants included the IH 460 utility tractor, and a hiboy model called the 460 Hi-Clear. The IH 460 Wheatland was offered for non-row-crop farming. Both an IH 460 orchard version and a lowered IH 460 grove version were offered for fruit and citrus growers. About 35,000 460s were produced, about $4,700 for gasoline to $5,400 for diesel-engined versions.

Farmall 560

The Farmall 560 is a five-plow row crop tractor produced from 1958 to 1963. Successor to the Farmall 450 series, it was part of the line of large tractors originating with the Farmall M. The updated tractors marked an attempt by Farmall to respond to increased competition from other tractor manufacturers that were introducing more modern tractors with greater power. The 560 and the smaller Farmall 460 were restyled and had new engines. Other components carried over from earlier lines caused reliability problems, harming International Harvester's reputation and market position.

A  diesel version was also offered. Variants included the IH 560 utility tractor, and a hiboy model called the 560 Hi-Clear.

Since the transmission components were unaltered from the original M systems, the larger engines produced immediate reliability issues, resulting in a public relations problem for International Harvester, and requiring replacement with new, redesigned powertrain components. The 560 had been restyled from previous series in an attempt to modernize the appearance of the Farmall line. About 70,000 560s were produced. Prices ranged from $6,000 for gasoline versions to $6,700 for diesels.

International Harvester 660
The 660 was not offered under the Farmall name as a row-crop tractor. It was a heavy general-purpose tractor whose lineage was more closely aligned with the McCormick-Deering W-9, and was the successor to the International Harvester 650. 6,959 were built from 1959 to 1963.

Comparable products
The Oliver 770 and Massey MF65 were comparable to the 460. The Oliver 880, Massey 85, and Cockshutt 570 were similar to the 560.

References

Farmall tractors
Vehicles introduced in 1958